The Secret of the Skies is a 1934 Australian film directed by A. R. Harwood about a bank robber who crashes an aircraft in remote bush. The story was inspired by the 1931 disappearance of the Southern Cloud flown by Sir Charles Kingsford Smith.

Plot
Hal Wayne (Norman Shepherd), a bank clerk, has absconded with £10,000 of his bank's money. He hijacks an aircraft, the Golden Eagle, which crashes in the mountains.

Wayne steals the remaining food and abandons the others to their death. He is driven half-mad in the wilderness and throws away his money before being found by a prospector and returned to civilisation. But he is haunted by guilt and three years later confesses to police.

Cast

 Paul Allsop as Larry Hamilton
 Norman Banks as first announcer
 Ella Bromley as Anne Walters
 John D'Arcy as Captain Sinclair
 Jimmy Dee as Monty Wright
 Guy Hastings as Detective Palmer
 Fred Patey as Frederick Holtz
 Norman Shepherd as Hal Wayne
 Ada Koradgi as Miss Mckenzie
 Eddie Balmer as second announcer

Production
The Secret of the Skies was partly shot in Cinesound Production's new studio facility in St Kilda, Melbourne in July 1933.

Release
Harwood managed to arrange distribution through Universal although he later claimed that the release was delayed too long. Critical reception was generally poor. One reviewer said:
"If one is to spend an hour on a mountain top with seven, stranded travellers it is desirable that they should be amusing or interesting in some way or other. Except for the pilot (played extremely well by John Darcy) they are ill at ease, and their conversation is starchy. This conversational stiffness is emphasised by the lack of action, particularly on the part of the camera, which is set down in front of the unhappy party, and stays there without a movement for minutes on end. But the film has its moments of vitality. The actual crash is first-rate; and quite equal to similar instances in American pictures... In some of the scenes in the bush one is made to feel the remoteness of the travellers and the hopelessness of their position; but elsewhere stagey treatment and acting often rob the film of the spontaneity and the dramatic intensity it should have possessed."

Despite a production cost of several thousand pounds the film only returned £325 to the producers.

References

Notes

Bibliography

 Pike, Andrew and Ross Cooper. Australian Film 1900–1977: A Guide to Feature Film Production. Melbourne: Oxford University Press, 1998. .

External links
 The Secret of the Skies at IMDb
 The Secret of the Skies at National Film and Sound Archive
 The Secret of the Skies at Oz Movies

1934 films
Australian aviation films
Australian black-and-white films
1930s action films
Australian action films
Australian romantic drama films
1934 romantic drama films